The 2013 FIBA Africa Championship Qualification occurred on various dates between 8 July 2012 and 23 February 2013. It was used to determine which African national basketball teams would qualify for the 2013 FIBA Africa Championship. Teams competed with other teams in their respective "zones" for a spot in the Championship tournament.

Qualified Teams
Four teams qualified for the tournament before the qualification round took place. Twelve more teams claimed spots in the tournament through Zonal Qualifying.

Qualified as the host nation:
 

Qualified by finishing in the top four at the 2013 FIBA Africa Championship:
 
 
 

Qualified through Zonal Qualifying:
 
 
 
 
 
 
 
 
 
 

Qualified through a wildcard:

Zones

Zone 1
Zone 1 was played from 15 to 17 July 2012 in Staouéli and Algiers, Algeria.

|}

Zone 2
Zone 2 was played from 12 to 18 August 2012 in Praia, Cape Verde.

|}

Zone 3
Zone 3 was played from 8 to 10 July 2012 in Ouagadougou, Burkina Faso.

|}

Zone 4
Zone 4 was played from 30 September to 11 October 2012 in Bangui, Central African Republic.

|}

Zone 5
Zone 5 was played from 20 to 26 January 2013 in Dar es Salaam, Tanzania.

Group A

|}

Group B

|}

Placement round

|}

Final round

Zone 6
Zone 6 was played from 17 to 23 February 2013 in Maputo, Mozambique.

|}

References

External links
 FIBA Africa

AfroBasket qualification
2012 in African basketball
2013 in African basketball
qualification